This is a list of songs written by Jerry Leiber and Mike Stoller, in most cases as a songwriting duo. The pair also collaborated with other songwriters, and also on rare occasions wrote songs as individuals with other writers.

Chart hits written by Leiber and Stoller

Chart hits written by Leiber with others

Chart hits written by Stoller with others

References

Leiber and Stoller
American rhythm and blues songs